John I, Duke of Mecklenburg-Stargard (1326 – 9 August 1392 or 9 February 1393), Duke of Mecklenburg from 1344 to 1352 and Duke of Mecklenburg-Stargard from 1352 to 1392.

Family 
He was probably the youngest child from the second marriage of Lord Henry II "the Lion" of Mecklenburg and Anna of Saxe-Wittenberg, a daughter of Duke Albert II of Saxe-Wittenberg.

Life 
John I was probably born in 1326.  His father died in 1329, and he remained under guardianship until 1344, when he came of age and began to carry a seal as a participant in the governance of Mecklenburg.  On 8 July 1348, Holy Roman Emperor Charles IV raised John and his brother Albert II to the rank of Duke in Prague.  John, Albert and Charles initially supported the False Waldemar, but in 1350 they reconciled with his supporter Duke Louis V of Bavaria.

Upon the division of Mecklenburg on 25 November 1352, John was awarded the Lordships of Stargard, Sternbuerg and Ture.  He supported his nephew Albert III of Mecklenburg in his attempts to be recognized as King of Sweden.

Marriages and issue 
John married three times. His first wife Rixa (background unknown) probably died soon after the wedding and the marriage remained childless.

His second wife Anna was a daughter of the count Adolf VII of Pinneberg and Schauenburg.  She probably died in 1358.  John and Anna had a daughter Anna, who married Wartislaw VI of Pomerania-Wolgast on 4 April 1363.

John's third wife Agnes was the daughter of Ulrich II of Lindow-Ruppin and widow of Lord Nicholas IV of Werle.  They probably married in 1358 and had five children together:
 John II (died between 6 July and 9 October 1416), co-regent, then Duke of Mecklenburg-Stargard, from 1408 Lord of Sternberg, Friedland, Fürstenberg and Lychen
 Ulrich I (died 8 April 1417), co-regent, then Duke of Mecklenburg-Stargard (1392–1417), from 1408 Lord of Neubrandenburg, Stargard, Strelitz and Wesenberg (with Lize)
 Rudolf (died after 28 July 1415), was initially Bishop of Skara and from 1390 as Rudolf III Bishop of Schwerin
 Albert I (died 1397), co-regent of Mecklenburg, from 1396 Coadjutor of Dorpat
 Contance (born c. 1373, died 1408)

External links 
 Genealogical table of the House of Mecklenburg

Dukes of Mecklenburg-Stargard
1326 births
1390s deaths
Date of death unknown
14th-century German nobility